Umm al-Qura or Um al-Qura (Arabic for "Mother of All Settlements") may refer to:

the city of Mecca in Saudi Arabia
Umm al-Qura Mosque in Baghdad, Iraq
 Umm al-Qura University in Mecca, Saudi Arabia
the Umm al-Qura calendar, an Islamic calendar based on astronomical calculations
 Um Al-Qura (newspaper), a Saudi newspaper